There have been two baronetcies created for persons with the surname Borthwick, both in the Baronetage of the United Kingdom.

The Borthwick Baronetcy, of Heath House in the County of Surrey, was created in the Baronetage of the United Kingdom on 12 July 1887. For more information on this creation, see the Baron Glenesk.

The Borthwick Baronetcy, of Whitburgh in Humbie in the County of Haddington, was created in the Baronetage of the United Kingdom on 21 July 1908 for Thomas Borthwick. He was Chairman of Thomas Borthwick & Sons, colonial merchants. In June 1912 he was nominated for a peerage, but died in July of the same year, before the patent had passed the Great Seal. However, on 10 December 1912 his eldest son Thomas Borthwick, the second Baronet, was created Baron Whitburgh, of Whitburgh in the County of Midlothian, in the Peerage of the United Kingdom. Furthermore, in February 1913 the first Baronet's widow Letitia Mary was given Royal licence to use the style of Baroness Whitburgh. The peerage became extinct on Lord Whitburgh's death in 1967, while he was succeeded in the baronetcy by his nephew, the third Baronet. He was the only son of the Hon. James Alexander Borthwick, second son of the first Baronet. The 4th Baronet Sir Antony Thomas Borthwick succeeded his father in 2002.

Borthwick baronets, of Heath House (1887)
see the Baron Glenesk

Borthwick baronets, of Whitburgh (1908)

Sir Thomas Borthwick, 1st Baronet (1835–1912) 
Sir Thomas Banks Borthwick, 2nd Baronet (1874–1967) (created Baron Whitburgh in 1912)

Barons Whitburgh (1912)
Thomas Banks Borthwick, 1st Baron Whitburgh (1874–1967)

Borthwick baronets, of Whitburgh (1908; reverted)
Sir John Thomas Borthwick, 3rd Baronet (1917–2002) 
Sir Antony Thomas Borthwick, 4th Baronet (born 1941)

References

Kidd, Charles, Williamson, David (editors). Debrett's Peerage and Baronetage (1990 edition). New York: St Martin's Press, 1990.

External links

Baronetcies in the Baronetage of the United Kingdom
Extinct baronetcies in the Baronetage of the United Kingdom